Rana Phool Muhammad Khan (Late) ,  was a Pakistani politician. He was a member of the Provincial Assembly of the Punjab (MPA), representing Phoolnagar in 1970, 1977. He has also served as a provincial minister of Punjab for more than one tenure in 1985 and 1990.

Town renamed
The town of Bhai Pheru was renamed Phool Nagar in the honour of Phool Khan.

See also
Elections in Pakistan
List of political parties in Pakistan
2007 Pakistani presidential election
2008 Pakistani presidential election
2008 in Pakistan

References

Year of birth missing
Year of death missing
Punjab MPAs 1972–1977
Punjab MPAs 1985–1988
Punjab MPAs 1988–1990
Punjab MPAs 1990–1993
People from Kasur District